Kshama Sawant (born October 17, 1973) is an Indian-American politician and economist who has served on the Seattle City Council since 2014. She is a member of Socialist Alternative, the first and only member of the party to date to be elected to public office.

A former software engineer, Sawant became an economics instructor in Seattle after immigrating to the United States from her native India. She ran unsuccessfully for the Washington House of Representatives in 2012 before winning her seat on the Seattle City Council in 2013. She was the first socialist to win a citywide election in Seattle since Anna Louise Strong was elected to the school board in 1916. Sawant narrowly survived a December 7, 2021 recall election for her position on the council by a margin of 310 votes, or 0.76%. It was the first held in Seattle since 1975.

Early life and career 
Born to H. T. and Vasundhara Ramanujam into a middle-class Tamil family in the city of Pune, India. Sawant was raised mostly in Mumbai. Her mother is a retired principal and her father, a civil engineer, was killed by a drunk driver when she was 13 years old. She describes her family as "full of doctors and engineers and mathematicians" but says that "I wasn’t exposed to any particular ideology growing up."

Sawant graduated with a bachelor's degree in computer science from the University of Mumbai in 1994. After moving to the United States with her husband Vivek Sawant, a Microsoft software engineer, she decided to turn her attention to economics following a year and a half stint as a programmer. She received her PhD in economics from North Carolina State University in 2003. Her dissertation was titled Elderly Labor Supply in a Rural, Less Developed Economy.

After moving to Seattle, she taught at Seattle University and University of Washington Tacoma and was an adjunct professor at Seattle Central College. She was also a visiting assistant professor at Washington and Lee University in Lexington, Virginia.

Early political career 
Sawant has indicated that the genesis of her becoming a socialist began in India, a country plagued by immense poverty. This development was furthered when she arrived in the United States, which she describes as "the wealthiest country in the history of humanity", and was surprised to encounter poverty and homelessness. In 2006, she attended a Socialist Alternative meeting after reading a pamphlet and proceeded to become a member.

In 2012, Sawant ran unsuccessfully for Position 1 in the 43rd district of the Washington House of Representatives, representing Seattle. Sawant also ran and advanced past the primaries as a write-in win for Position 2. Washington state law allowed her to choose the election in which she would run, but as a write-in candidate, she was not permitted to state her party preference. Sawant successfully sued the Washington secretary of state for the right to be listed as a Socialist Alternative member on the ballot. Sawant challenged incumbent Democratic House speaker Frank Chopp in the general election on November 6, 2012. She received 29% of the vote to Chopp's 70%.

Seattle City Council

2013 election 
After her unsuccessful run for the House, Sawant entered the race for Seattle City Council with a campaign organized by the Socialist Alternative. She won 35% of the vote in the August primary election, and advanced into the general election for the at-large council position 2 against incumbent Richard Conlin, making her the first socialist to advance to a general election in Seattle since 1991. On November 15, 2013, Conlin conceded to Sawant when returns showed him down by 1,640 votes or approximately 1% of the vote.

Sawant's victory made her the first socialist to win a citywide election in Seattle since Anna Louise Strong was elected to the School Board in 1916 and the first socialist on the City Council since A. W. Piper, elected in 1877. She was sworn into office on January 6, 2014.

Sawant declared a victory in May 2014 after Seattle Mayor Ed Murray announced an increase in the minimum wage to $15, which was the cornerstone of her campaign for City Council, but she is not pleased that large corporations will be allowed a few years to phase in the wage hike. During a speech at the City Council on the day of the vote she said, "We did this. Workers did this. Today’s first major victory for 15 will inspire people all over the nation."

Several Democrats endorsed her candidacy. Celebrity endorsements included Rage Against the Machine guitarist Tom Morello and System of a Down frontman Serj Tankian.

Sawant received no endorsements from sitting councilmembers, while Mike O'Brien expressed support of the idea of third party candidates but explicitly declining to extend an endorsement of Sawant. The Stranger alt-weekly endorsed both her State House and her City Council candidacy. Councilman Nick Licata also declined to endorse her but spoke positively of her campaign saying, "she has been able to craft a message that is understandable, simple and eschews most of the rhetoric", and when her eventual election victory seemed unlikely, he expressed his hope that Sawant would not "disappear after the election if she loses. She represents the poor, the immigrants, the refugees—the folks who are not in our City Council offices lobbying us."

Tenure 

During her campaign, Sawant said that, if elected, she would donate the portion of her salary as a City Council member that exceeded the average salary in Seattle. On January 27, 2014, she announced that she would live on $40,000 of her $117,000 salary. She places the rest into a political fund that she uses for social justice campaigns. As of September 19, 2021, she cited her current city-allotted salary as $140,000, while she continues to take home $40,000 of that amount.

Sawant called for the expansion of bus and light rail capacity with a millionaire's tax. She has also called for "transit justice", which would include free user fares; an increase in free transit services to the poor, especially communities in south Seattle; and restriction of transit options to communities that "can afford other options" until the foregoing measures are implemented.

During the 2014 Israel–Gaza conflict, Sawant urged the Seattle City Council to condemn both Israel's attacks on Gaza and Hamas's attacks on Israel, and called on President Obama and Congress to denounce the Israeli blockade of Gaza and to cut off all military assistance to Israel. Sawant's call to condemn Israel's actions prompted a response from Israeli ambassador Ron Dermer, calling for Sawant to retract the statement.

2015 election 
The core issues of Sawant's campaign were a successful minimum wage increase to $15/hour, a successful "millionaire's tax" or income tax on wealthy Seattleites, and an unsuccessful rent control program. Back during the 2013 campaign, Sawant had said rent control is "something everyone supports, except real estate developers and people like Richard Conlin" and compared the legal fight for its implementation to same-sex marriage, and the legalization of marijuana in the United States, both of which she supports. Her campaign for a $15 an hour minimum wage has been credited for bringing the issue into the mainstream and attracting support for the policy from both Seattle former Mayors Michael McGinn and Ed Murray. In response to criticism that a $15 an hour minimum wage could hurt the economy, she said, "If making sure that workers get out of poverty would severely impact the economy, then maybe we don't need this economy." She is also a supporter of expanding public transit and bikeways, ending corporate welfare, ending racial profiling, reducing taxes on small businesses and homeowners, protecting public sector unions from layoffs, living wage union jobs, and social services.

Sawant's platform of non-local Seattle issues, like rent control, income tax, corporate welfare, supporting the minimum wage outside Seattle, in SeaTac, and other cities, and participating in the Seattle Arctic drilling protests drew criticism from Sawant's opponents and favor with her leftist supporters. Her District 3 opponent Pamela Banks criticized Sawant's status as a national figure was a distraction from her primary duty to serve her constituents. The Seattle Times, in their endorsement of Banks, said the City Council "isn't a job for an ideologue" and that "the District 3 seat is more than a podium", that it "needs a collaborative leader to work with other districts and balance resources and investment." On April 7, 2015, journalist Chris Hedges endorsed Sawant.

Sawant advanced through the primary election for City Council District 3 representative on August 4, 2015 with 52% of the vote, 18 percentage points ahead of her closest opponent, Pamela Banks at 34%. Voters returned Sawant to the City Council and made her the first District 3 representative in November 2015, with 17,170 votes counted for Sawant and 13,427 for Banks, or 56% to 44%. With incumbent O'Brien elected to District 6, and former Licata aide Lisa Herbold elected to District 1, they, along with Sawant, became the new progressive bloc of the Council, which became majority female with the addition of two other women, Debora Juarez and Lorena González. Sawant, as one of the four people of color on the new Council, also became part of a younger and more diverse Council, the first to seat members by district in more than 100 years.

2019 election 

In 2019, Sawant ran against Egan Orion, the head of the United States Chamber of Commerce in Capitol Hill.

The 2019 Seattle City Council election gained national attention after Amazon spent an unprecedented $1.5 million on the campaign. The company, which is the largest private employer in the city, contributed the funds to a political action committee operated by the Seattle Metropolitan Chamber of Commerce which backs candidates the chamber considers to be more "business-friendly". The PAC supported Sawant's opponent in the race. Amazon became increasingly involved in city council politics after the passage of the Seattle head tax in 2018, which would have cost the company $11 million annually in order to fund public housing and homeless services. Shortly after enacting the tax, the city council voted 7–2 to repeal it, with Sawant being one of the two dissenters.

On November 5, 2019, Sawant was elected to a third term on the Seattle City Council.

2020–present

Sawant and Mayor Jenny Durkan repeatedly clashed, and in June 2020, Sawant said that the mayor should resign. In a letter to the Council president on June 30, 2020, Durkan asked the City Council to investigate Sawant under its city charter authority to punish members for "disorderly or otherwise contemptuous behavior," writing that Sawant had participated in a march to her home, knowing that her address "was protected under the state confidentiality program because of threats against me due largely to my work as U.S. Attorney." The mayor accused Sawant and others of acting "with reckless disregard of the safety of my family and children." Additionally, Sawant led protesters into Seattle City Hall, which was closed to the public due to the coronavirus pandemic, on the evening of June 9, 2020. Durkan also alleged that Sawant had used her council office to promote the "Tax Amazon" ballot initiative, urged protesters to occupy the East Precinct police station, and involved Socialist Alternative in her council office staffing decisions. Durkan said that she respected policy disagreements with members, but that these 
disagreements, "do not justify a council member who potentially uses their position in violation of law or who recklessly undermines the safety of others, all for political theatre." In response, Sawant accused Durkan of being the leader of a "pro-corporate political establishment" and of carrying out "an attack on working people's movements."

In August 2020, petitioner Ernie Lou submitted a petition to the King County Elections Office to recall Sawant, which was allowed to proceed in a decision by the Washington Supreme Court on April 1, 2021. Sawant responded by denying the charges in the petition and claiming that the recall effort was backed by right-wing billionaires. The recall campaign was criticised by journalist Liza Featherstone, who characterised it as being controlled by "tech corporations, real estate interests, and business lobbyists". In September 2021, the King County Elections Office set the recall election date for December 7. Sawant's strategy for the recall election focused on driving up turnout among young voters, one of her core constituencies. It was the first recall election held in Seattle since the 1975 recall election against Mayor Wesley C. Uhlman.  The results of the election were close, with Sawant overcoming the recall by 310 votes, which was 0.76% of the 41,033 votes cast. The turnout was 52.9%.

On January 19, 2023, Sawant announced that she would retire from the city council at the end of the year, instead announcing that she would be launching Workers Strike Back, a national labor movement.

Political positions 

Sawant has advocated the nationalization of large Washington State corporations such as Boeing, Microsoft, and Amazon and expressed a desire to see privately owned housing in "Millionaire's Row" in the Capitol Hill neighborhood turned into publicly owned shared housing complex saying, "When things are exquisitely beautiful and rare, they shouldn't be privately owned." During an election victory rally for her City Council campaign, Sawant criticized Boeing for saying it would move jobs out of state if it could not get wage concessions and tax breaks. She called this "economic terrorism" and said in several speeches that if the company moved jobs out of state, the workers should take over its facilities and bring them into public ownership. She has said they could be converted into multiple uses, such as production for buses. Sawant maintains that a socialist economy cannot exist in a single country and must be a global system just as capitalism today is a global system.

Sawant opposed the construction of the Alaskan Way Viaduct replacement tunnel calling it "environmentally destructive" and "something most people were against, most environmental groups were against".

She opposed the Seattle Public Schools Measures of Academic Progress test in public schools, and supported the teachers' boycott of the standardized tests. Sawant has called for a revolt against student debt saying that "the laws of the rich are unenforceable if the working class refuses to obey those laws". She is an active member of the American Federation of Teachers union and has been critical of American labor union leadership, saying the leadership, "in the last 30 years has completely betrayed the working class. They are hand in glove with the Democratic Party, pouring hundreds of thousands of dollars into their campaigns, and they tell rank and file workers that you have to be happy with these crumbs". Sawant believes the American Labor movement should break with the Democratic Party and run grassroots left-wing candidates.

Sawant advocates for a moratorium on deportations of undocumented immigrants from Seattle and granting unconditional citizenship for all persons currently in the United States without citizenship. She opposes the E-Verify system.

Political ideology
Sawant is a member of Socialist Alternative, the United States section of the Trotskyist international organization the International Socialist Alternative, formerly the Committee for a Workers' International (CWI).

Sawant said she rejects working with either the Democratic or the Republican party and advocates abandoning the two-party system. She has called for "a movement to break the undemocratic power of big business and build a society that works for working people, not corporate profits—a democratic socialist society." In 2013, Sawant urged other left-wing groups, including Greens and trade unions, "to use her campaign as a model to inspire a much broader movement".

On February 20, 2019 she published an article in Socialist Alternative backing Bernie Sanders' run for the Democratic nomination. In 2020, she spoke at a campaign rally for him at the Tacoma Dome in Tacoma, Washington. She joined the Democratic Socialists of America in February 2021.

Occupy movement 

Before running for office, Sawant received attention as an organizer in the local Occupy movement. She praised Occupy for putting "class," "capitalism," and "socialism" into the political debate. After Occupy Seattle protesters were removed from Westlake Park by order of Seattle Mayor Michael McGinn, Sawant helped bring them to the Capitol Hill campus of Seattle Central Community College, where they remained for two months. She joined with Occupy activists working with local organizations to resist home evictions and foreclosures, and was arrested with several Occupy activists including Dorli Rainey on July 31, 2012 for blocking King County Sheriff's deputies from evicting a man from his home.

The Sawant state campaign criticized the raiding of Occupy Wall Street activists' homes by the Seattle Police Department's SWAT team. She also advocated on LGBT, women's, and people of color issues, and opposed cuts to education and other social programs. She gave a teach-in course at an all-night course at Seattle Central Community College.

Civil disobedience
On November 19, 2014, Sawant was arrested on a charge of disorderly conduct at a $15 minimum wage protest in SeaTac, Washington. She was released on $500 bail. On May 1, 2015, a SeaTac municipal court judge dismissed charges against her. The judge determined that testimony provided by police demonstrated that it was technically the police themselves, not protesters, who had blocked traffic.

In a February 2017 article in the socialist magazine Jacobin, Sawant called for a "wave of protests and strikes" on May Day, including "workplace actions as well a mass peaceful civil disobedience that shuts down highways, airports, and other key infrastructure". Her statement was controversial: Seattle Mayor Ed Murray said that it was "unfortunate and perhaps even tragic for an elected official to encourage people to confront and engage in confrontations with the police department" and the Washington State Patrol called the writings "irresponsible" and "reckless".

In June 2020, Sawant was criticized by the Trotskyist World Socialist Web Site (WSWS) for supposedly working "along politically harmless channels by promoting illusions in local police reform" and for promoting "the anarchistic commune" known as the Capitol Hill Autonomous Zone (CHAZ). Following a June 20 shooting in the zone that left one man dead and another critically wounded, Sawant said there were "indications that this may have been a right-wing attack," for which President Trump would bear "direct responsibility, since he has fomented reactionary hatred specifically against the peaceful Capitol Hill occupation". Two days later, The Seattle Times reported, Sawant "walked back her unfounded claim that the shooting 'may have been a right-wing attack.' She now says that appears to be incorrect".

Personal life
Sawant is often reticent about her personal life and background, preferring to stick to political issues. She has said that her entire family remains in India with her mother currently residing in Bangalore. During her 2013 campaign for the Seattle City Council, she indicated that she and her husband Vivek Sawant, had been separated for nearly six years. In 2014, Sawant and Calvin Priest, a Seattle Socialist Alternative organizer, purchased a home together in the Leschi neighborhood. In 2016, Sawant took time off to be out of the country for their wedding. Kshama became a United States citizen in 2010.

Electoral history

References

External links 

Kshama Sawant, Seattle City Council Position 2 at Seattle.gov
Kshama Solidarity Campaign
Entry at VoteSmart
Socialist Alternative
King County voters' pamphlet November 5, 2013 General And Special Election, Seattle, Council Position No. 2
King County voters' pamphlet August 4, 2015 Primary And Special Election, Seattle, Council District No. 3

1973 births
21st-century American economists
21st-century American politicians
21st-century American women politicians
Far-left politicians in the United States
American people of Marathi descent
American politicians of Indian descent
American socialist feminists
American women economists
Asian-American people in Washington (state) politics
Candidates in the 2012 United States elections
Economists from Washington (state)
Indian emigrants to the United States
International Socialist Alternative
Living people
Democratic Socialists of America politicians from Washington
North Carolina State University alumni
Politicians from Pune
Seattle City Council members
Seattle University faculty
University of Mumbai alumni
Washington (state) socialists
Women city councillors in Washington (state)